Mariam Hussein Oueidat (born September 16, 1983) is an Iraqi–Moroccan actress, living in the UAE.

Early life 
Mariam was born in the Moroccan city of Tétouan; her father is Iraqi, and her mother is Moroccan. In 2009, She started acting through her participation in The Neighbors. She continued her artistic work after that. The Maid marked her true beginning. In 2011, she started singing, and presented her first single, "Men Shefteh".

Personal life 
In May 2016, she married the Saudi Faisal Al-Faisal, but their marriage did not last long, and they separated in December of the same year. In February 2017, she gave birth to her daughter, Amira.

Career 
In 2012, she started presenting programs. Her first program was the competition program, "Every Day Maryoum", which was shown on Al-Youm Channel, and was criticized by the audience on the pretext that she was pretending to be intrusive and intruding on Emirati nationality. In 2013, she presented the second season of it. She was chosen as Miss Gulf of Actresses in 2016.

Television series

Theatre

Cinema

Awards
 2010: Winner of the Best Promising Actress Award from "Jordan's First Festival of Arab Media" for her role in the series Eid Night.
 2012: Winner of the Best Gulf Actress Award from the "Distinguished in Ramadan Festival" for her role in the series Darb Al-Wafa.

References 

Living people
1988 births
Emirati people of Moroccan descent
Iraqi people of Moroccan descent
Iraqi actresses
21st-century Iraqi women singers
Iraqi film actresses
Iraqi television actresses
Moroccan film actresses
Moroccan television actresses